Lisa Kerr is a British business leader. After a career in commercial radio, in 2016 she was appointed principal of Gordonstoun. She is the first female principal in the school’s history. Kerr is also a Deputy Lord-Lieutenant of Moray.

Education and early career 

Kerr attended Broughton High School, Edinburgh, and the City of Edinburgh Music School before studying Music at the University of York.

Her early career was in the commercial radio industry. She was a presenter and producer for Classic FM and Radio Forth and was Group Managing Director of Radio Services Ltd before becoming Director of Strategy for RadioCentre, the UK commercial radio industry trade association. Kerr is a Fellow of The Radio Academy.

She has been a Vice Chair of Scottish Opera. and a member of the UK and Ireland Regulatory Board of The Royal Institution of Chartered Surveyors.

Gordonstoun 

Kerr joined the Board of Governors of Gordonstoun in 2007. She was appointed principal in 2016, succeeding Simon Reid, and took up the post in 2017.

References 

Year of birth missing (living people)
Living people